The British Dental Students' Association is a representative body of the dental students studying at British dental schools.  The association was established in 1942.

Positions 
The Executive Committee are made up of five positions at present: President, Treasurer, Communications, Secretary & Sportsday Organiser; Conference Organiser, and Past President (only advisory role).

References

External links
 Website at British Dental Association

Dental organisations based in the United Kingdom
Dentistry education in the United Kingdom
Medical and health student organizations
Student organisations in the United Kingdom
Student organizations established in 1942
1942 establishments in the United Kingdom